Pinoquio is a monotypic genus of South American cellar spiders containing the single species, Pinoquio barauna. It was first described by B. A. Huber & L. S. Carvalho in 2022, and has only been found in Brazil.

References

Pholcidae
Spiders of South America